Wen Zhong is a character in the classic Chinese novel Fengshen Yanyi. Wen Zhong had been the top ranked official under King Da Yi since the times of old. Following the death of Da Yi, Wen Zhong crowned Zi Shou as the new king of the Shang Dynasty. In short time, Wen Zhong headed out on his great dragon to subdue rebelling demons within the North Sea (an action that would take over fifteen years). 

Throughout Wen Zhong's fifteen years of battle, he would be destined to play a very large role in the schemes of Heaven. By decree of the Jade Emperor himself, Wen Zhong attained a third eye atop his forehead. This third eye could see through any level of disillusion and falsehood. Upon Wen Zhong's arrival at the Noon Gate, he greeted his colleagues and saw the absurdity of the situation; immediately Wen Zhong ordered the king to come before him. After listening to the king's bickering, and easily seeing through to his true deluded idiocy, Wen Zhong invited his allies to attend to the situation.

Wen Zhong was appointed as the deity of Puhua Tianzun (普化天尊) in the end.

Notes

References
 Investiture of the Gods chapter 27

Chinese gods
Investiture of the Gods characters